Justin Mulder (born 27 September 1996) is a Dutch football player plays for ACV Assen.

Club career
He made his professional debut in the Eerste Divisie for FC Emmen on 25 April 2014 in a game against Fortuna Sittard.

References

External links
 
 

1996 births
People from Hoogezand-Sappemeer
Living people
Dutch footballers
FC Emmen players
Eerste Divisie players
Association football midfielders
Asser Christelijke Voetbalvereniging players
Footballers from Groningen (province)